"Plush" is a song by American rock band Stone Temple Pilots. It was released as the second single from the band's 1992 debut studio album, Core, in 1993 and became their first single to top the Billboard Album Rock Tracks chart.

Composition and inspiration
The song's chord structure was inspired by bassist Robert DeLeo's love of ragtime music, and its lyrics were loosely based on a newspaper article lead singer Scott Weiland had read about a girl who had been found dead after having been kidnapped in the early 1990s. Weiland had also said that the song's lyrics are a metaphor for a failed relationship.

Reception
The song was released in 1993 as Cores second single and became a major rock radio hit in the United States, peaking at number one on the Album Rock Tracks and number nine on the Modern Rock Tracks. The song was also one of the first alternative rock songs to reach the number-one spot on the Album Rock Tracks chart during the height of the alternative rock/grunge scene. "Plush" won in the category of "Best Hard Rock Performance" at the 1994 Grammy Awards. The music video also earned the band an MTV Video Music Award for Best New Artist in 1993. "Plush" remains one of the biggest rock hits of the 1990s, and it still receives airplay on radio stations. The song also was voted number 12 on the Australian annual music poll Triple J Hottest 100 in 1993. The song appeared as a playable song in the music video games Rock Band 3 and Power Gig: Rise of the SixString in addition to the VH1 series Hindsight. According to Nielsen Music's year-end report for 2019, "Plush" was the fourth most-played song of the decade on mainstream rock radio with 133,000 spins. All of the songs in the top 10 were from the 1990s.

Music video
The award-winning music video, directed by Josh Taft, was released in 1993 and had heavy rotation on MTV. It combines a visual interpretation of the song's lyrics with footage of Weiland singing with the band as a lounge act in an empty bar. There are two different versions of this video, with minor differences. On the Thank You Bonus DVD, the last shot of the video features a woman looking at a mirror image of herself viewing her whole body while the mirror image drifts away. In another version, she is looking at a mirror image of her face, with water (possibly rain) dripping down the reflection of the mirror.

Acoustic version
Weiland and Stone Temple Pilots guitarist Dean DeLeo performed an impromptu acoustic version of "Plush" on the MTV show Headbangers Ball in 1992. The recording was originally only available on a CD single from the United Kingdom for their single, "Creep", and on the German promotional radio release "Plush (unplushed)", but it was not officially released anywhere else until it appeared on the band's 2003 "greatest hits" compilation, Thank You, alongside the original studio recording. While this acoustic rendition did not chart on any U.S. or international charts, it did get moderate airplay when the original version had heavy airplay on radio at the time. A rare first take of the same acoustic version on MTV's Headbangers Ball was also available, but it was only found as a B-side to the rare "Crackerman" single. It has the same length and processing as the original electric version, and also uses the last part of the original electric version.

Track listingsUK 7-inch and cassette single "Plush" (edit) – 4:19
 "Sin" – 6:05UK 12-inch singleA1. "Plush" – 5:14
A2. "Sin" – 6:05
B1. "Sex Type Thing" (Swing Type version) – 4:20
B2. "Plush" (Acoustic Type version) – 4:47UK and Australian CD single "Plush" (edit) – 4:19
 "Sin" – 6:05
 "Sex Type Thing" (Swing Type version) – 4:20
 "Sex Type Thing" (live on The Word) – 3:32Japanese mini-CD single'''
 "Plush" (acoustic from MTV Headbanger's Ball'': Take 1)
 "Wicked Garden"

Charts

Weekly charts

Year-end charts

Decade-end charts

Release history

References

Stone Temple Pilots songs
1993 singles
Atlantic Records singles
Grammy Award for Best Hard Rock Performance
Song recordings produced by Brendan O'Brien (record producer)
Songs based on actual events
Songs inspired by deaths
Songs written by Eric Kretz
Songs written by Robert DeLeo
Songs written by Scott Weiland